The Jellyvision Lab, Inc. is an American software company based in Chicago, Illinois. Founded in 1989, and as a video game development company by Harry Gottlieb in 1995, Jellyvision has since transitioned to creating benefits guidance software.

History 
Jellyvision was originally founded in 1989 as an educational media company, later pivoting to develop video games. Founder Harry Gottlieb created the CD-ROM game You Don't Know Jack in 1995, which became a massive success and established a franchise of You Don’t Know Jack titles from 1995 to 1998. Facing a major shift in the computer game market, as players moved from personal computers to home consoles, Jellyvision shuttered in 2001.

Later that year, Gottlieb launched a new company called the Jellyvision Lab, with a focus on developing business software inspired by You Don’t Know Jacks voice-driven interface. In 2009, Jellyvision developed the first version of ALEX, an interactive conversation that helps employees choose their benefits. The success of ALEX spurred Jellyvision's growth, and as of 2019 is the company's primary business focus, expanding to offer an interactive HSA product and year-round financial guidance.

In 2008, the original Jellyvision Games was relaunched as a subsidiary of the Jellyvision Lab. It spun off into its own company in 2011, and rebranded as Jackbox Games in 2013.

In 2017, Jellyvision acquired the healthcare platform FlexMinder.

References

External links 
 

Companies based in Chicago
1989 establishments in Illinois
Video game companies established in 1989
Privately held companies based in Illinois
Video game companies of the United States
Video game development companies